The Tabernacle Baptist Chapel, Ffwthog, near Cwmyoy, Monmouthshire is a Baptist chapel, with attached manse, dating from 1837. Largely unaltered externally and internally, the chapel is a Grade II* listed building.

History and description
The chapel was built in 1837 and carries the date in a tablet above the entrance gable. The inscription reads; "TABERNACLE Baptist Chapel ST. JT. Builders. 1837." The manse is attached to the chapel, which has a Grade II* listing as "a little-altered example."

The architectural historian John Newman describes the chapel as; "a simple gable-ended building." It is constructed of Old Red Sandstone rubble, with a Welsh slate roof. The porch is 20th century but the doors are original. The interior has a seating gallery on three sides, supported by cast iron pillars. Newman reports; "long rows of hat-pegs at both levels."

Notes

References
 

Grade II* listed churches in Monmouthshire
History of Monmouthshire
Baptist churches in Wales